The Montepuez River is a river of Mozambique. It flows to the south of the Ruvuma River, and is characterised by seasonal flows and lined by swamps.

References

Rivers of Mozambique